Noroff Education is a privately owned and operated university college and vocational school offering a variety of different study programmes including vocational programs and bachelor's degrees.

Noroff University College
Noroff University College currently offers five bachelor's degrees, Interactive Media Games, Interactive Media Animation, and in the Faculty of applied computing Digital Forensics, Cyber Security and Applied Data Science . The University draws on a number of international staff to deliver educational programs.  These degrees are offered both online and on the Kristiansand campus all in English. Admission is via both direct admission and the Norwegian University admission system samordna opptak

Noroff Vocational School
Vocational programs include design, communication, media, animation, film, music, network, IT security, and CAD.  Some courses are offered in Norwegian.

Campuses
The Noroff’s main administrative offices are in Kristiansand, Norway. 
Noroff has campuses in these Norwegian cities: Oslo, Bergen, Kristiansand and Stavanger and has an extensive online education business through Noroff Online Studies.

The schools have approx. 850 full-time students on campus and online each year.

History
The Noroff Institute, Inc. in Norway was established in 1987. At that time the school had 120 students in the first class and with focus on providing the business world with skilled, creative co-workers through an intensive and practical school year. In 2001 the Noroff Institute had more than 1,000 full-time students and had grown to become one of Norway’s largest schools in creative production and IT subjects. At this time the company heavily pursued internet-based education in the Web student department. In 2005 the Noroff Institute started four high schools based on media and communication under the trade name ”Mediegymnaset” (Noroff High School) in Stavanger, Kristiansand, Oslo and Fredrikstad. In 2007 Noroff Institute had grown to become one of the largest schools in Europe in the animation subject 3D Design, in addition, it had become Norway’s largest school with regard to the number of students in Film Production.

The school is in cooperation with universities abroad in England, Wales, Australia and South Africa which makes it possible for the students to complete a bachelor's degree by taking the third year out of the country.

Noroff has NOKUT approved studies which meet qualifications for loans and scholarships in Lånekassen for Norwegian students.

External links

References 

Universities and colleges in Norway
Education in Norway

no:Liste over universitet og høgskoler i Norge